The 2017 Tahiti Championship competition was the 44th season of the Tahitian domestic rugby union club competition operated by the Fédération Polynésienne de Rugby (FPR).

References

Tahiti
Rugby union in Tahiti
Tahiti